Peter Coughlan (born 8 April 1947) is an Australian former swimmer. He competed in three events at the 1976 Summer Olympics.

References

External links
 

1947 births
Living people
Australian male freestyle swimmers
Olympic swimmers of Australia
Swimmers at the 1976 Summer Olympics
Place of birth missing (living people)
Commonwealth Games medallists in swimming
Commonwealth Games silver medallists for Australia
Swimmers at the 1974 British Commonwealth Games
20th-century Australian people
Medallists at the 1974 British Commonwealth Games